In number theory, the Bateman–Horn conjecture is a statement concerning the frequency of prime numbers among the values of a system of polynomials, named after mathematicians Paul T. Bateman and Roger A. Horn who proposed it in 1962. It provides a vast generalization of such conjectures as the Hardy and Littlewood conjecture on the density of twin primes or their conjecture on primes of the form n2 + 1; it is also a strengthening of Schinzel's hypothesis H.

Definition
The Bateman–Horn conjecture provides a conjectured density for the positive integers at which a given set of polynomials all have prime values. For a set of m distinct irreducible polynomials ƒ1, ..., ƒm with integer coefficients, an obvious necessary condition for the polynomials to simultaneously generate prime values infinitely often is that they satisfy Bunyakovsky's property, that there does not exist a prime number p that divides their product  f(n) for every positive integer n. For, if there were such a prime p, having all values of the polynomials simultaneously prime for a given n would imply that at least one of them must be equal to p, which can only happen for finitely many values of n or there would be a polynomial with infinitely many roots, whereas the conjecture is how to give conditions where the values are simultaneously prime for infinitely many n.

An integer n is prime-generating for the given system of polynomials if every polynomial ƒi(n) produces a prime number when given n as its argument. If P(x) is the number of prime-generating integers among the positive integers less than x, then the Bateman–Horn conjecture states that

where D is the product of the degrees of the polynomials and where C is the product over primes p

with  the number of solutions to

Bunyakovsky's property implies   for all primes p,
so each factor in the infinite product C is positive.
Intuitively one then naturally expects that the constant C is itself positive, and with some work this can be proved.
(Work is needed since some infinite products of positive numbers equal zero.)

Negative numbers
As stated above, the conjecture is not true: the single polynomial ƒ1(x) = −x produces only negative numbers when given a positive argument, so the fraction of prime numbers among its values is always zero. There are two equally valid ways of refining the conjecture to avoid this difficulty:
One may require all the polynomials to have positive leading coefficients, so that only a constant number of their values can be negative.
Alternatively, one may allow negative leading coefficients but count a negative number as being prime when its absolute value is prime.
It is reasonable to allow negative numbers to count as primes as a step towards formulating more general conjectures that apply to other systems of numbers than the integers, but at the same time it is easy
to just negate the polynomials if necessary to  reduce to the case where the leading coefficients are positive.

Examples
If the system of polynomials consists of the single polynomial ƒ1(x) = x, then the values n for which ƒ1(n) is prime are themselves the prime numbers, and the conjecture becomes a restatement of the prime number theorem.

If the system of polynomials consists of the two polynomials ƒ1(x) = x and ƒ2(x) = x + 2, then the values of n for which both ƒ1(n) and ƒ2(n) are prime are just the smaller of the two primes in every pair of twin primes. In this case, the Bateman–Horn conjecture reduces to the Hardy–Littlewood conjecture on the density of twin primes, according to which the number of twin prime pairs less than x is

Analogue for polynomials over a finite field

When the integers are replaced by the polynomial ring F[u] for a finite field F, one can ask how often a finite set of polynomials fi(x) in F[u][x] simultaneously takes  irreducible values in F[u] when we substitute for x elements of F[u].  Well-known analogies between integers and F[u] suggest an analogue of the Bateman–Horn conjecture over F[u], but the analogue is wrong.  For example, data suggest that the polynomial

in F3[u][x] takes (asymptotically) the expected number of irreducible values when x runs over polynomials in F3[u] of odd degree, but it appears to take (asymptotically) twice as many irreducible values as expected when x runs over polynomials of degree that is 2 mod 4, while it (provably) takes no irreducible values at all when x runs over nonconstant polynomials with degree that is a multiple of 4. An analogue of the Bateman–Horn conjecture over F[u] which fits numerical data uses an additional factor in the asymptotics which depends on the value of d mod 4, where d is the degree of the polynomials in F[u] over which x is sampled.

References

 
 .
 

Conjectures about prime numbers
Unsolved problems in number theory
Analytic number theory